The Republic of Stakhanov was a proposed separatist republic of Pavel Dryomov on the territory of the city of Stakhanov within the separatist Luhansk People's Republic.

Before the war Dryomov was a bricklayer in Stakhanov. At the beginning of the conflict in Eastern Ukraine, Dryomov offered Stakhanov citizens an alternate vision to that of the LPR - a new, socialist neo-Soviet, "Cossack" republic "that works for the poor and elderly". In 2014 Dryomov was called the "savior of Stakhanov" by the British journalist Oliver Carroll who wrote an article about him in Politico magazine. According to Carroll, one of the main points of departure between The Republic of Stakhanov and the Luhansk People's Republic was whether to adhere to the Minsk Protocol ceasefire deal with Ukraine. Dryomov advocated continuing the War in Donbas. During a speech, he advocated his views and stated  "We've had enough corruption and slavery here for a century! We're not fools—neither Poroshenko nor Putin are interested in an honest country!" Nothing would be allowed to get in the way of destiny, he declared: "We will build a Cossack republic right here in Stakhanov!"

According to some sources, on September 14, 2014, Don Cossacks in Stakhanov, Ukraine proclaimed the Republic of Stakhanov, with the city of Stakhanov serving as the administrative centre and its 60,000 people. They claimed that a "Cossack government" now ruled in Stakhanov.  However, the following day, this was claimed to be a fabrication, and an unnamed Don Cossack leader stated the September 14 meeting had, in fact, resulted in 12,000 Cossacks volunteering to join the LPR forces.

Pavel Dryomov died on 12 December 2015 when his car was blown up while he was traveling the day after his wedding.

See also
 Luhansk People's Republic
 Donetsk People's Republic
 National Council of Bessarabia
 Luhansk status referendum, 2014
 2014 pro-Russian conflict in Ukraine
 List of rebel groups that control territory
 List of designated terrorist organizations
 List of active separatist movements in Europe
 Novorossiya (confederation)

References

History of Luhansk Oblast
War in Donbas
Separatism in Ukraine
Russian irredentism
Luhansk People's Republic
Proposed countries